Phot is the RTGS romanization of the Thai masculine given name .

People with the name include:

Phot Phahonyothin (1887–1947), also known by the noble title Phraya Phahonphonphayuhasena, the first prime minister of Thailand
Poj Arnon (born 1970), Thai film director
Pote Sarasin (1905–2000), Thai diplomat and former prime minister

Thai masculine given names